Golam Robbani Choton (born 2 July 1968) is a Bangladeshi professional football coach and former player, who is the current head coach of Bangladesh women's under-14, Bangladesh women's under-17, Bangladesh women's under-20 and Bangladesh women's national football team. He is considered as the pioneer of Bangladesh women's football. Golam Robbani had played for Fakirerpool Young Men's Club and Arambagh KS for most of his playing career as a defender.

Early years 
Golam Robbani Choton was born on July 2, 1968 in Bogra, Bangladesh and spent his childhood there. But, he and his family originally from Tangail.

Career

In the 1983–84 season, he began his senior playing career by playing for Bashabo Tarun Shangho, where he spent three seasons. Then, he joined Fakirerpool Young Men's Club in the 1987–88 season. After spending 3 seasons at Fakirerpool Young Men's Club, he signed a contract with Wari Club Dhaka. Subsequently, he played for Fakirerpool Young Men's Club and Arambagh KS. Most recently in the 2001–02 season, he joined BRTC FC from Arambagh KS; He retired after playing only one season for BRTC FC.

In 1993, Golam Robbani made his debut as a manager of T&T Club. After stepping down as T&T's manager for just one season, he took over as T&T's manager again in the 1996–97 season, the second time he spent about 10 seasons as T&T's manager. He then joined Dipali Jubo Sangha as a manager. In 2009, he became the manager of the Bangladesh national women's team as well as the manager of the Bangladesh women's under-20 team. Later, he also became the manager of Bangladesh Women's Under-14 and Bangladesh women's under-17 teams. As a manager, he has won 7 titles so far, including the 2018 SAFF U-18 Women's Championship

Under his coaching, Bangladesh clinched their maiden SAFF Women's Championship title with a 3-1 victory over Nepal in an entertaining final at the Dasharath Rangasala in Kathmandu on 19 September 2022, and they became runner-up at the SAFF Women's Championship 2016..

Honours

Manager 
SAFF Women's Championship
Champion : 2022
Runner-up (1) : 2016
South Asian Games
Bronze (2) : 2010, 2016
SAFF U-18 Women's Championship
Champion (2) : 2018, 2021
Bangamata U-19 Women's International Gold Cup
Champion (1) : 2019
SAFF U-15 Women's Championship
Champion (1) : 2017
Runner-up (2) : 2018, 2019
AFC U-14 Girls' Regional Championship – South and Central
Champion (2) : 2015, 2016

See also 

 Bangladesh women's national football team
 Bangladesh women's national under-20 football team
 Bangladesh women's national under-17 football team
 Bangladesh national football team

References

External links 

Soccerway.com profile
Linkedin profile
Twitter profile

1968 births
Living people
People from Tangail District
People from Bogra District
Bangladeshi footballers
Bangladeshi football managers
Association football defenders